Kult is a Polish rock band formed in 1982 in Warsaw, originally consisting of Kazik Staszewski (lead vocals, saxophone), Piotr Wieteska (bass), Tadeusz Bagan (guitars) and Dariusz Gierszewski (drums). Kult's early works were strongly influenced by alternative, progressive and punk rock, as well as the British new wave, but the band gradually incorporated more diverse and innovative styles in their music. The music of the band is primarily associated with strong lyrics by Staszewski and distinct wind section (saxophones, horn).

Before forming the band, all members of the original quartet had been playing together in either Poland or Novelty Poland, two bands led by Staszewski between 1979 and 1981. The first concert of the new band in July 1982 sold only 14 tickets. However, in 1986 the band recorded its first album (named eponymously "Kult"; released the following year), which attracted much attention and included early punk-inspired hits "Krew Boga", "O Ani" and "Wspaniała nowina". Initially the censorship office did not allow for release of many songs by Staszewski, clearly aimed against "the system". Also in 1987 a second album, the slightly psychedelic "Posłuchaj to do Ciebie" was released. Since then the band gained much popularity in Poland, with songs such as "Do Ani", "Arahja" and "Krew Boga" reaching #1 on Polish Radio 3 chart (LP3).

After 1989 and the end of Communist rule in Poland Kult enjoyed great success, with each of a series of albums bringing new hits to the tops of the radio charts. The "Generał Ferreira / Rząd oficjalny" from the 1991 album "Your Eyes" reached No. 1 on LP3 and stayed in the Top20 for 33 consecutive weeks. "Dziewczyna bez zęba na przedzie", "Komu bije dzwon", "Gdy nie ma dzieci" and "Lewy czerwcowy" (from the 1998 album "Ostateczny krach systemu korporacji") all reached No. 1 and stayed in the Top20 for 37, 38, 30 and 23 weeks, respectively. In addition, "Gdy nie ma dzieci" spent 9 weeks at #1, a former record among Polish artists, surpassed by Artur Rojek's "Syreny" in 2014.

Although the recent post-2000 albums by Kult enjoyed less popularity, Kult remains one of the best-known Polish musical groups. The band released a total of 13 studio albums and two live albums, including the 2010 recording of a MTV Unplugged concert.

History 

Kult was formed in 1982 from Kazik Staszewski's previous band, Novelty Poland.

In July 1982 the band performed at its first concert at the Remont Club in Warsaw.

Although it was not released until July 1987, the first Kult release was recorded in September 1986.

Kult's music has its roots in punk, but now it has some elements of rock, ska, jazz, traditional balladry, reggae, and even poetry. From the start, the group has had an instantly recognizable sound and is distinguished by the voice and provocative lyrics of the lead singer, Kazik Staszewski.

Kult became famous for the atmosphere they created at their concerts and the unorthodox message in their songs. Kult's songs attack 'the system', understood as a conglomerate of the communist state apparatus, the Catholic Church, and others. In the nineties Kult took on the 'new system', which was seen as founded on pseudo-democratic leaders, the clergy and corporations.

Members 
The original members of Kult were:

Tadeusz Bagan (1982) – guitar
Dariusz "Misiek" Gierszewski (1982) – drums
Kazik Staszewski (1982–present) – vocals, saxophone
Piotr Wieteska (1982–1986) – bass

The band's lineup changed over the years. As of 2008, Kult consists of:

Tomasz Goehs (1998–present) – drums
Tomasz Glazik (2003–present) – tenor sax and baritone sax
Janusz Grudziński (1982–1998; 1999–present) – keyboards, guitar, cello and vibraphone
Wojciech Jabłoński (2008–present) – guitar
Piotr Morawiec (1982–1983; 1987–1988; 1989–present) – guitar
Kazik Staszewski (1982–present) – vocals, saxophone
Jarosław Ważny (2008–present) – trombone
Irek "Jeżyk" Wereński (1986–present) – bass
Janusz Zdunek (1998–present) – trumpet

Discography

Studio albums

Live albums

References

External links 
Official website (in Polish)

Polish rock music groups
Musical groups established in 1982
1982 establishments in Poland